Grasshopper beam engines are beam engines that are pivoted at one end, rather than in the centre.

Usually the connecting rod to the crankshaft is placed between the piston and the beam's pivot. That is, they use a second-class lever, rather than the usual first-class lever.

Origins 

The first recorded example of a grasshopper beam was William Murdoch's model steam carriage of 1784. The beam offered negligible mechanical advantage and appears to have been used primarily instead of a crosshead, for what was effectively a return connecting rod engine. The American engineer Oliver Evans drew a high-pressure marine grasshopper engine in 1801, and in 1805 built the Oruktor Amphibolos, an amphibious dredger.

Almost all grasshopper engines placed the crankshaft between the piston and the beam's pivot. This allows a long stroke for the piston, with a shorter stroke for the crank, although with greater force. This was advantageous for early low-pressure steam engines that had limited cylinder force but could increase their power by using a longer cylinder. A few exceptions, those of the Americans Oliver Evans' boats and Phineas Davis' Grasshopper locomotives, reversed this and placed the cylinder in between the pivot and crank: a third-class lever.

Many grasshopper engines were built as stationary engines. A few notable early steam locomotives used beam engines, all of which were of the grasshopper pattern. Rather more grasshopper engines were built as marine engines.

Marine engines 

One of the most important uses for the grasshopper engine was as a marine engine for paddle steamers. In marine use, the grasshopper engine was termed the 'half-lever' engine and used a pair of low-set levers, one each side of the cylinder. This gave a low centre of gravity for stability and a high crankshaft, suitable for driving paddlewheels. Comet's engine's designer, Henry Bell, had established a pattern for an engine that would be widely used for paddle steamers over the next half-century.

Stationary engines 
Unlike the heavy masonry engine house used to support the beam and pivot of a conventional beam engine, the grasshopper beam was pivoted on a swinging link. The crankpin was carried directly by the beam and moved in a straight line vertically, the beam pivot moving slightly sideways on its link to allow this. This simplified the need for a parallel motion linkage on the piston rod. Grasshopper engines were thus lighter than conventional beam engines and could be built completely in factories, rather than requiring considerable erection work to be carried out on-site. This encouraged the use of grasshopper engines for smaller sized engines. Some makers, notably Easton & Amos of Southwark, specialised in such engines. Many were used for pumping, but not for powering large mills.

Surviving stationary engines 

 Stephenson (1823) Birmingham Museum  
 Morland Brewery, Reading (c. 1830) Abingdon, private collection  
 Plessey Mill, Northumberland (c. 1830)  
 Pair of engines by Easton & Amos (1854) Lound pumping station, Suffolk  
 Easton & Amos (1856) Wrotham Park, Barnet 
 Easton & Amos (1861) Royal Horticultural Society, Wisley, later the Royal Albert Hall. Now at the Science Museum
 Haywards Heath (1865) Royal Scottish Museum, Edinburgh

Grasshopper steam locomotives 

 Puffing Billy / Wylam Dilly (1813–1815)
 Stourbridge Lion / Agenoria (1828)
 Baltimore & Ohio grasshopper locomotives (1832)

Notes

References 

Beam engines
Marine steam engines
Straight line mechanisms